The American Wind Symphony Orchestra (AWSO, also called the American Wind Symphony, or AWS) is an American musical ensemble incorporating many of the wind instruments found in a symphony orchestra. It is dedicated to the performance of contemporary classical music, and which is known for having commissioned over 400 new works. Based in Mars, Pennsylvania, the AWSO was founded 1957 and directed for 50 years by the American conductor (and former trumpeter) Robert Austin Boudreau (b. 1927).

Description
The group, whose membership changes from year to year, typically is composed of young professional musicians. Many of the works it performs feature an unusually large instrumentation usually including at least 4 flutes (doubling on piccolo, alto flute, and bass flute), 4 oboes (doubling on English horn and oboe d'amore), 4 bassoons (doubling on contrabassoon and heckelphone), 4 clarinets (doubling on E-flat clarinet, basset horn, bass clarinet, and contrabass clarinet), 4-6 trumpets, 4-7 horns, 4-6 trombones, a bass trombone, and 1-2 tubas. Percussion, harp, piano, and celeste are usually included as well, but, unlike most concert bands, saxophones and euphoniums are never used.

Concert venues
The group usually has performed annually during the summer months on a floating arts center designed by the American architect Louis Kahn. Point Counterpoint II, constructed in 1976, is the second boat used by the orchestra.  The original Point Counterpoint was a coal-transporting barge converted by Kahn in 1961, and named after the Point State Park in downtown Pittsburgh, near where it was constructed. The newer boat was designed to be able to navigate American canals and locks more easily than the original vessel. Kahn died suddenly in 1974, two years before the new boat debuted in celebration of the American Bicentennial.

The underside of the hinged canopy shows a series of square, circular domed, and pyramidal cavities, similar to the ceiling of the Yale University Art Gallery building, an iconic design by Kahn. The overhead structure can be lowered over the barge for protection and easier transport. As a flourish, Boudeau liked to start a performance with Aaron Copland's Fanfare for the Common Man while the hinged canopy gradually opened, revealing the performers.

Aboard, there are also rooms for up to 13 crew members, staff, and the director to live, an art gallery below deck, and a small theater where special patrons' concerts take place. The other personnel of the large group must travel by land, and stay overnight in accommodations provided by hosts of the tours.

In 2017 with the retirement of Robert Boudreau near the age of 90, the future of the orchestra and its home, the Point Counterpoint II, appeared bleak. The 1600-ton barge looked like it was headed for the scrapyard, when renowned cellist Yo-Yo Ma wrote in the July New York Review of Books appealing for help. In response, bids to save the vessel came in from London, Paris, Estonia, Philadelphia, Charleston (South Carolina), Washington DC, Kingston (New York), and Buffalo (New York), among other places. , Boudreau is evaluating a number of bids, some reputedly between $3–4 million.

Performances and tours
The founder and longtime conductor of the AWSO has been Robert Boudreau, a graduate of the Juilliard School and a former Fulbright Scholar.  He also held a captain's license, and piloted the Point Counterpoint II on numerous concert tours through canals and rivers in the US and Europe. Each summer, the group has performed on the barge's stage, anchored in one of Pittsburgh's rivers. The group also has performed on the barge along various waterways of the United States (including the Ohio and Mississippi Rivers, as well as their tributaries), giving concerts along the way. The orchestra spent three years overseas, where they were present for the Bicentennial celebration of France, the 800th Anniversary in England, and were the first US vessel in Leningrad.

Boudreau took a hiatus of several years after the 2004 residency, but after Hurricanes Katrina and Rita felt compelled to travel to Louisiana in 2006. The post-disaster tour was called the "Spirit of Louisiana", and the reception in the southernmost cities of Louisiana was so great the orchestra returned for a few weeks in 2007. Boudreau once again announced a retirement as music director following the final concert of the 2007 season at Yale University.

A 2008 New England tour was being developed for June and July, to begin at Highcroft, Boudreau's farm in Pine Township, Pennsylvania. The orchestra would have three residencies there, performing at the Caroline Steinman Nunan Amphitheater. The orchestra would then meet up with Point Counterpoint II in Narragansett, Rhode Island, with performances in Maine to follow for several weeks. The orchestra would then proceed up the Hudson River to the Erie Canal and have closing concerts at the end of July back at Highcroft.

Boudreau's wife, Kathleen, has assisted with the organization of the AWSO. She was writing a book on the history of the AWSO from her perspective throughout the years.

Criticism

Boudreau's leadership of the American Wind Symphony Orchestra has courted controversy over the years. In 1985, he was arrested by Federal marshals for sailing his vessel contrary to US Coast Guard regulations.

Boudreau's actions have at times antagonized the larger professional music community of Pittsburgh, and caused him to be charged with unfair labor practices with regard to the treatment of his musicians.

In March 2013, the Sheriff's Office of Okaloosa County, Florida issued a warrant for Boudreau's arrest, alleging grand theft of $25,000 in appearance fees for a June 2012 concert which the AWSO never performed.  He was never arrested, but went to Florida as required by law, where the authorities took his picture and his fingerprints. Boudreau signed a note that promised he would appear if required before a judge, and returned to Pennsylvania. His lawyer represented him at a later hearing, and the judge dismissed all charges without prejudice. Boudreau has cited a lack of housing for the orchestra members as reason for the failure to perform, and refused to return the funds, claiming that he thought they were "a donation to the orchestra".

Musicians from that summer's tour have also alleged having never been paid for part of the season. The AWSO letter of agreement with musicians specified, “In the event that Orchestra determines at any time that it is unable to complete a substantial portion of its remaining concert schedule, it may forthwith terminate this agreement by notice, oral or written, to Instrumentalist, without any responsibility thereafter to Instrumentalist, except to pay his/her stipend or scholarship grant pro-rated up to one (1) week following the date of such notice." A similar experience took place earlier in the week with the 2015 group of musicians. High and dangerous river conditions, lack of housing, lack of funds, and complaints about talent were among the given excuses for shortening the tour.

Composers commissioned by the AWSO
The AWSO has a long history of commissioning original works, many of which also feature extensive use of percussion instruments:

Samuel Adler
Samuel Akpabot
David Amram
Thom Anderson
Alexander Arutiunian
Blas Atehortua
Georges Auric
Henk Badings
Robert Russell Bennett
Warren Benson
Elmer Bernstein
William Bolcom
Eugène Bozza
Lee Bracegirdle
Henry Brant
Leo Brouwer
Jacques Castérède
Chou Wen-Chung
Paul Creston
Ton de Leeuw
Daniel Dorff
Halim El-Dabh
Akin Euba
Robert Farnon
Luboš Fišer
Jean Françaix
Bernd Franke
Mats Larsson Gothe
Carmago Guarnieri
Alan Hovhaness
J. J. Johnson
George Kleinsinger
Norman Lloyd
Nikolai Lopatnikoff
Ivana Loudová
Toshiro Mayuzumi
Robert McBride
Colin McPhee
Akira Miyoshi
Oliver Nelson
Bo Nilsson
Javier Gimenez Noble
Arne Nordheim
Krzysztof Olczak
Ben-Zion Orgad
Juan Orrego-Salas
Krzysztof Penderecki
Andrei Petrov
Zbigniew Pniewski
Carlos Rafael Rivera
Joaquín Rodrigo
Bernard Rogers
Ned Rorem
Ramon Santos
Jerzy Sapieyevski
Lalo Schifrin
Hale Smith
Harry Somers
Gottfried Stoeltzel
Carlos Surinach
Erkki-Sven Tüür
Ivan Tcherepnin
Sergei Tcherepnin
Roberto Valera
Heitor Villa-Lobos
Healey Willan
Patrick Zuk

References

Renshaw, Jeffrey H. (1991). The American Wind Symphony Commissioning Project: A Descriptive Catalog of Published Editions 1957-1991. Music Reference Collection. Greenwood Press. . .

External links
American Wind Symphony Orchestra Home
Photos

Audio
American Wind Symphony Orchestra audio samples

Video
Video documentary

Musical groups established in 1957
Musical groups from Pittsburgh
Wind bands
Contemporary classical music ensembles
Orchestras based in Pennsylvania
1957 establishments in Pennsylvania